The minister of housing and diversity and inclusion is a minister of the Crown and a member of the Cabinet of Canada. The minister is associated with the Department of Canadian Heritage. 

Multiculturalism has been part of the portfolio from the former multiculturalism and citizenship portfolio, which was last held in 2015 and re-created in 2019 with additional responsibilities for youth issues.

List of ministers
Key:

References

Diversity and Inclusion and Youth